Amele (Amele: Sona) is a Papuan language of Papua New Guinea. Dialects are Huar, Jagahala and Haija.

Amele is notable for having 32 possessive  classes.

Phonology 
Amele has only 5 vowels: /i, ɛ, æ, u, ɔ/.

Grammar
Amele has seven tense-aspect categories, including four past tenses:

past habitual
remote past
yesterday’s past
today’s past
plus present
future
relative future

References

External links 
 Alphabet and pronunciation

Gum languages
Languages of Madang Province